Switzerland is scheduled to compete at the 2024 Summer Olympics in Paris from 26 July to 11 August 2024. Swiss athletes have appeared in every Summer Olympic Games edition of the modern era, except for a partial boycott of Melbourne 1956 as a protest to the Soviet invasion of Hungary.

Competitors
The following is the list of number of competitors in the Games. Note that reserves in field hockey, football, and handball are not counted:

Athletics

Swiss track and field athletes achieved the entry standards for Paris 2024, either by passing the direct qualifying mark (or time for track and road races) or by world ranking, in the following events (a maximum of 3 athletes each):

Track and road events

Cycling

BMX
Freestyle
Swiss riders received a single quota spot in the men's and women's BMX freestyle for Paris 2024, finishing among the top two at the 2022 UCI Urban Cycling World Championships in Abu Dhabi, United Arab Emirates.

Equestrian

Switzerland entered a full squad of equestrian riders to the team eventing competition through a top-seven finish at the 2022 FEI Eventing World Championships in Pratoni del Vivaro, Italy.

Eventing

Swimming

Swiss swimmers achieved the entry standards in the following events for Paris 2024 (a maximum of two swimmers under the Olympic Qualifying Time (OST) and potentially at the Olympic Consideration Time (OCT)):

References

Nations at the 2024 Summer Olympics
2024
2024 in Swiss sport